Microcaecilia unicolor is a species of amphibian in the family Siphonopidae. It is endemic to French Guiana. Its natural habitats are subtropical or tropical moist lowland forests, plantations, rural gardens, urban areas, and heavily degraded former forest.

References

unicolor
Amphibians described in 1864
Taxonomy articles created by Polbot